Pavel Alekseyevich Sivakov (born 11 July 1997) is a French cyclist, who currently rides for UCI WorldTeam . He is also a citizen of Russia and rode as a Russian until 2 March 2022.

Personal life
Sivakov is the son of Russian former cyclists Alexei Sivakov and Aleksandra Koliaseva. He was born in Italy, but grew up in Soueich, Haute Garonne in France. Sivakov started competing for Russia. In March 2022, he changed his cycling nationality to France, due to his opposition to the 2022 Russian invasion of Ukraine.

Career

In August 2018, he was named in the startlist for the 2018 Vuelta a España.

In April 2019, Sivakov won Stage 2 of the Tour of the Alps, his first professional victory. He held the race lead for the rest of the race, taking overall victory by 27 seconds ahead of teammate Tao Geoghegan Hart.

In May 2019, he was named in the startlist for the 2019 Giro d'Italia. Sivakov finished 9th overall in only his second Grand Tour.

Sivakov took overall victory at the 2019 Tour de Pologne after a second place on the first mountain stage and a finish among the peloton on the final stage. Sivakov took the leader's jersey after the last stage, after previous leader Jonas Vingegaard suffered larger losses.

In August 2020, he was named in the start list for the 2020 Tour de France.

Major results

2014
 1st  Overall Ronde des Vallées
1st Stage 1
 2nd Overall Grand Prix Rüebliland
2015
 1st  Time trial, National Junior Road Championships
 1st  Overall Oberösterreich Juniorenrundfahrt
1st  Points classification
1st Stage 2
 1st Tour of Flanders Juniors
 3rd Overall Internationale Niedersachsen-Rundfahrt
2016
 1st Stage 1 (TTT) Giro della Valle d'Aosta
 1st Prologue (TTT) Tour de Berlin
 2nd Liège–Bastogne–Liège Espoirs
 2nd Overall Olympia's Tour
1st  Young rider classification
2017
 1st  Overall Ronde de l'Isard
1st  Young rider classification
1st Stages 2 & 4
 1st  Overall Giro della Valle d'Aosta
1st Stage 3
 1st  Overall Giro Ciclistico d'Italia
1st  Young rider classification
 Tour de l'Avenir
1st  Mountains classification
1st Stage 9
 1st  Mountains classification, Tour de Normandie
 2nd Overall Olympia's Tour
2018
 2nd Time trial, National Road Championships
 4th Overall Settimana Internazionale di Coppi e Bartali
1st  Young rider classification
1st Stage 1b (TTT)
2019
 1st  Overall Tour of the Alps
1st  Young rider classification
1st Stage 2
 1st  Overall Tour de Pologne
 4th Overall Tour of Britain
 8th Overall Herald Sun Tour
1st  Young rider classification
 8th Overall Route d'Occitanie
 9th Overall Giro d'Italia
Held  after Stages 13–15
2020
 1st  Young rider classification, Tour Down Under
 2nd Overall Route d'Occitanie
 2nd Cadel Evans Great Ocean Road Race
2021
 4th Overall Vuelta a Burgos
 6th Overall Tour of the Alps
 9th Road race, UEC European Road Championships
 Vuelta a España
Held  after Stage 7–8
2022
 1st  Overall Vuelta a Burgos
 2nd Clásica de San Sebastián
 9th Overall Volta a la Comunitat Valenciana
 10th Overall Tour of the Alps
2023
 5th Overall Étoile de Bessèges
 9th Overall Paris–Nice
 10th Overall Vuelta a Andalucía

Grand Tour general classification results timeline

Notes
1.Sivakov tested positive from coronavirus and was forced to withdraw.

References

External links

1997 births
Living people
French male cyclists
People from San Donà di Piave
Olympic cyclists of Russia
Cyclists at the 2020 Summer Olympics
Russian male cyclists
Naturalized citizens of France
Cyclists from the Metropolitan City of Venice
Sportspeople from Haute-Garonne
French people of Russian descent
Cyclists from Occitania (administrative region)
21st-century French people
20th-century French people